Olivia Jade Attwood (born 2 May 1991) is an English television personality, presenter and model. In 2017, she appeared on the third series of Love Island and later became a regular cast member on the ITVBe reality series The Only Way Is Essex. In November 2022, she participated in Series 22 of I'm a Celebrity...Get Me Out of Here! but withdrew on medical grounds two days after arriving.

Early life
Attwood was born on 2 May 1991 in London. She has two siblings, Georgia and Max. After young years living in London, Surrey, England and Alberta, Canada, she attended Tormead School and Cranleigh School.

Career
Attwood began her career as a model and a motorsport grid girl. In 2017, she became a contestant on the third series of the ITV2 reality dating show Love Island. Along with Chris Hughes, she reached the final and the pair finished in third place. The following year, Attwood and Hughes starred in their own spin-off series Chris & Olivia: Crackin' On.

In 2018, Attwood appeared on series five of Celebs Go Dating. Attwood reportedly lied about being single in order to appear on the show. However she denied the claims. In 2019, Attwood joined the cast of The Only Way Is Essex for its twenty-fourth series. She appeared in 16 episodes before leaving at the end of series 26 in 2020.

In 2020, Attwood began starring in her own reality series on ITVBe titled Olivia Meets Her Match, which followed the events leading up to her engagement with footballer Bradley Dack. She and Dack also appeared in ITV's Drama vs. Reality advertisement alongside Anna Friel. In 2021, she appeared on the ITV2 series Celebrity Karaoke Club. She has also made appearances on Lorraine, Tipping Point: Lucky Stars, The Crystal Maze, The Real Housewives of Cheshire and Loose Women.

In 2021, it was announced that Attwood would present a series with ITV titled Getting Filthy Rich. The series, which aired in 2022, explored the online selling of sexual content on OnlyFans. Later in 2022, Attwood began competing in the ITV competition series I'm a Celebrity...Get Me Out of Here! but withdrew on medical grounds shortly after arriving.

Personal life
Attwood dated Chris Hughes whom she met on Love Island until 2018. She is currently engaged to footballer Bradley Dack. She has ADHD.

Filmography

See also
 List of I'm a Celebrity...Get Me Out of Here! (British TV series) contestants
 List of Love Island (2015 TV series) contestants

References

1991 births
Living people
People from Guildford
People educated at Tormead School
English female models
English television personalities
Love Island (2015 TV series) contestants
Association footballers' wives and girlfriends
I'm a Celebrity...Get Me Out of Here! (British TV series) participants